Carlos Garrote (born 16 July 1991) is a Spanish sprint canoeist.

He became the European K-1 200m champion in 2018 and has also won a couple of World Championship medals in other events from 2017.

References

External links
TheSports.org profile

Living people
1991 births
Spanish male canoeists
ICF Canoe Sprint World Championships medalists in kayak
Mediterranean Games gold medalists for Spain
Mediterranean Games medalists in canoeing
Competitors at the 2018 Mediterranean Games
European Games competitors for Spain
Canoeists at the 2019 European Games
People from Zamora, Spain
Sportspeople from the Province of Zamora
21st-century Spanish people